Plastics, or The Plastics, were a short-lived Japanese new wave band who rose to prominence in the late 1970s and early 1980s. Their music was a major influence on Japanese pop music and their songs have been covered by many bands, most notably Polysics, Pizzicato Five, and Stereo Total.

In September 2007, Rolling Stone Japan ranked their debut album Welcome Plastics at No. 19 on their list of the "100 Greatest Japanese Rock Albums of All Time".

Biography 
Fellow new wave bands Talking Heads, The B-52's and Devo were fans of Plastics and were instrumental in getting their albums released in the United States. The band's mainstream exposure began when Toshio Nakanishi designed a tour program book for Talking Heads and gave their frontman David Byrne a tape of Plastics demos. Byrne promptly sent it to the B-52's' manager, who offered to represent them internationally.

The band used the Roland CR-68 and CR-78 drum machines for their early albums. In 1980, member Masahide Sakuma had some input on the Roland Corporation's development of the Roland TR-808 drum machine. When its development was complete, the Plastics owned the first TR-808 model, which they used on their 1981 album Welcome Back.

On February 19, 1982, NBC's late night comedy show SCTV aired the promotional video for Plastics' song "Top Secret Man" as part of the "Midnight Video Special" sketch, hosted by Gerry Todd (Rick Moranis).

Stereo Total's cover of their song "I Love You, Oh No!" (with the title amended to "I Love You Ono") was used in television commercials for Sony Ericsson in Europe around 2006 and by Dell computers in the US in 2009.

On January 16, 2014, Masahide Sakuma died from scirrhous gastric cancer and a brain tumor. He was 61. On May 10, 2016, Plastics got together to perform their final concert at Blue Note Tokyo. On February 25, 2017, Toshio Nakanishi died from esophageal cancer, also at the age of 61. The following year, the band released the recording of their final concert under the name A in memory of Nakanishi.

Band members 
  – vocal, synth drums
  – vocal, guitar & percussion
  – guitar & vocal
  – keyboards, guitar & bass programming
  – rhythm box

Discography

Studio albums

Live albums

Compilation albums

Singles

EPs

Selected compilation appearances

Notes 
 The Plastics performed "Last Train to Clarksville" as a medley with other songs by the Monkees, namely "Star Collector" and "She".

References

External links 
 Discography with notes by Nicholas D. Kent
 AllMusic Biography by Ian Martin
 ExcavatingThe80's Tribute
 Trouser Press bio
 Band overview
 MySpace Profile (cached copy on the Way Back Machine)

Japanese new wave musical groups
Japanese techno music groups
Musical groups from Tokyo